D.Gray-man Hallow (stylized as D.Gray-man HALLOW) is an anime series adapted from the Katsura Hoshino's manga, D.Gray-man. Produced by TMS Entertainment and 8PAN, and directed by Yoshiharu Ashino, it acts as a sequel to the previous D.Gray-man anime series and follows a young Exorcist named Allen Walker from the Black Order which are in charge of destroying weapons, known as Akuma, using objects known as "Innocence". The Akuma are created by an ancient sorcerer known as the Millennium Earl, who is allied with the immortal Noah Family. The plot focuses on Allen's connection with the Noah and his ally, Yu Kanda, who is planned to be used by them.

The series was announced at Shueisha's 2016 Jump Festa event. It aired in Japan from July 4, 2016, to September 26, 2016, having a total of 13 episodes. It was also broadcast on Animax Asia. On June 23, 2016, Funimation announced that they licensed Hallow and would stream it online. The English adaptation was also released by Funimation, and started on August 3, 2016.

In Japan, the episodes were originally meant to be collected in a total of six DVD and Blu-ray volumes. However, the home media release of Hallow was delayed in September 2016 to an unknown release date due to unmentioned reasons. In March 2017, the official D.Gray-man Hallow website stated the home media release was cancelled due to "various circumstances". 

The music of the anime was composed by Kaoru Wada. The series's opening theme song is "Key -bring it on, my Destiny-" by Lenny code fiction, and the ending theme is "Lotus Pain" by Mashiro Ayano. The single of Lenny code fiction was released on August 31, 2016 while "Lotus Pain" was released on August 2, 2016.

Release
The episodes feature a new cast, with Ayumu Murase voicing Allen Walker and Shinnosuke Tachibana voicing Howard Link. The new series is directed by Yoshiharu Ashino and written by Michiko Yokote, Tatsuto Higuchi and Kenichi Yamashita, featuring character designs by Yosuke Kabashima. During recordings of Hallow, Katsura Hoshino was surprised by Ayumu Murase's work, finding him suitable for Allen. Murase's switching between two personalities—Allen and the Nea D. Campbell—impressed the manga author, who thought at first Murase was using a machine to change the tone of them. Although Murase only appeared with the Millennium Earl twice in Hallow, his job left a positive impression. During a broadcast of Hallow, Hoshino made multiple illustrations of Allen interacting with the Noah clan to support the actors. Murase was moved by Hoshino's determination to develop Allen in the manga and thus felt a better impression of his character. Aoyama's work received praise by Hoshino due to the fact he has to perform both sides of the Earl: the free-spirited clown-looking like character and the mourning human self who is determined to recover his brother, Nea. Aoyama was surprised by the Hoshino's comments stating he did not understand her overwhelming reaction. Aoyama also felt that playing the Earl's human form was difficult due to how different he behaves in that appearance to the point of being one of the hardest character to voice.

Episode list

Reception
D.Gray-man Hallow was one of the most-anticipated anime series of summer 2016 by followers of Anime News Network and the Japanese web portal goo. Since he had not watched the original anime for some time, Alex Osborn of IGN appreciated the brief exposition in the sequel's first episode to remind the audience of the plot. Although he enjoyed the interaction among the main cast, Osborn was confused by the revelation that Allen would become the 14th Noah and had to watch the scene again in order to understand it. In a later review, Osborn said he was amazed by Allen's first possession by the 14th Noah; although it was "disturbing", it enhanced the character's development. Anne Laurenroth remarked Kanda's character development in Hallow, particularly his fight against Alma Karma and his return to the Order in the finale. Laurenroth noted Hallow poor animation and pacing but, although most of its episodes were grim, its final moments were upbeat. Manga Tokyo appreciated the black and white morality of the story when Allen is imprisoned by the Order he was working for and has to rely on the Millennium Earl's comrades in order to survive. However, the reviewer felt that viewers needed more information than what the story was able to provide.

See also

References

D.Gray-man episode lists